Oxford Fashion Week is an annual independent fashion showcase in Oxford, England.  It was founded in 2009 by Oxford University graduates Carl Anglim and Victoria Watson. The event is currently organised by Carl Anglim and Tiff Saunders. Carl works as the director and Tiff works as assistant director.  Oxford Fashion Week has showcased the talent of designers such as Alexander McQueen, Matthew Williamson and Valentin Yudashkin.

History 
Oxford Fashion Week was established in 2009. The event is now an annual fashion feature and takes place primarily over the course of one week in the year, with satellite events at other times. In 2009 and 2010, Oxford Fashion Week took place in May. In 2011, it took place in March. In 2012, it took place in November. Since 2013, the Oxford fashion week is taking place biannually displaying summer collections in March and autumn collections in September.

Oxford Fashion Week is mostly produced by volunteers from across the United Kingdom, although in 2012 it was produced by events production company BMLY Ltd.

The event takes place in a range of notable venues across the city of Oxford. Previous venues have included the Ashmolean Museum, Oxford Town Hall, Malmaison hotel, the Randolph hotel, Oxford University Examination Schools, and the Sheldonian theatre.

Designers and Shows 
Oxford Fashion Week has featured a wide variety of designers, from established international brands such as Alexander McQueen, Matthew Williamson and Valentin Yudashkin, to up-and-coming talent such as Ara Jo and Yvonne Lau (both of whose designs have been sported by Lady Gaga).

The shows are arranged by clothing category, rather than by individual designer. Most years have featured a concept fashion show, a ready to wear show, and an haute couture show, among others.

The catwalk shows feature a mix of professional models and new faces, and some models first discovered at Oxford Fashion Week have since gone on to have successful modelling careers.

References 

Fashion events in England
Events in Oxford
2009 establishments in England
Recurring events established in 2009
Annual events in England
Fashion weeks